Kingston Hill may refer to:
Kingston Hill, London, a district in southwest London, England
SS Kingston Hill, a British cargo ship built in 1940 and torpedoed and sunk in 1941
Kingston Hill (horse), a British Thoroughbred racehorse